The Ministry of Investment (MISA), till 2020 as the Saudi Arabian General Investment Authority (SAGIA), is a government ministry in Saudi Arabia that oversees foreign investment in the country besides issuing licenses to foreign investors. It was established as the General Investment Authority in 2000 during the reign of King Fahd and was transformed into a ministry in 2020 through a royal decree issued by King Salman. Khalid al-Falih, the former chairman of Saudi Aramco was appointed as the new minister by replacing governor Ibrahim al-Omar following the ministry's renaming.

History and governance 
Historically, SAGIA held responsibility for issuing foreign investment licenses to non-Saudi companies that wished to operate in the Kingdom, and lacked a broader role in Saudi economic regulation. Prince Abdullah ibn Faisal ibn Turki al Abdullah Alsaud, a member of a side branch of the ruling House of Saud, was Chairman of SAGIA from 2000 until his resignation in March 2004. He promoted more openness to foreign investment in Saudi Arabia, as well as a period of trade liberalization and privatization, and his tenure coincided with Saudi Arabia's accession to the World Trade Organization. However, Prince Abdullah faced resistance from more conservative factions within the Saudi government who opposed economic reforms, as well as the Saudi bureaucracy.

The SAGIA played a key role in Saudi Arabia's Vision 2030 initiative, which focused on economic liberalization, foreign direct investment, and economic development. In 2017, SAGIA launched Tayseer program, aimed at improving the investment climate for private companies. SAGIA has signed a number of major non-oil investment agreements. At its third annual Future Investment Initiative (FII) conference, which took place in October 2019, SAGIA signed  23 agreements collectively $15 billion. These included a $700 million investment deal with Modular Middle East; a $300 million investment deal with ForDeal, a $200 million deal with Shiloh Minerals, a $120 million investment deal with BRF Brazil Food, a $110 million investment deal with KME, and a $50 million deal with Xylem Inc. In October 2011, Pfizer signed an agreement with SAGIA to set up its first manufacturing plant in King Abdullah Economic City; in 2016, SAGIA gave Pfizer 100% foreign ownership of its legal entity in Saudi Arabia. In August 2017, SAGIA allowing 100% foreign ownership in the engineering business for the first time; the rules remained restrictive, such that only established multinationals were eligible.

In 2020, a royal order was issued, replacing SAGIA with a new Ministry of Investment under Khalid al-Falih, the former chairman of Saudi Aramco. The creation of the Investment Ministry was part of a broader Saudi government reshuffle by Crown Prince Mohammed bin Salman (MBS), the de facto ruler of the kingdom. MBS has aggressively moved to diversify the Saudi economy away from petroleum. It was unclear whether the new Investment Ministry would be more powerful than SAGIA.

References 

Investment
2020 establishments in Saudi Arabia
Ministries established in 2020
Saudi